The  is a private railway company in Kanagawa Prefecture and Shizuoka Prefecture, Japan. The company also operates excursion ships, and the group companies operate buses and taxis. The company has its roots in  founded in 1893. Izuhakone Railway is a member of Seibu group. The Daiyūzan Line accepts PASMO, a smart card ticketing system.

Railway lines
The company operates two detached lines in different prefectures. The Daiyūzan Line runs in Kanagawa Prefecture, while the Sunzu Line runs in Shizuoka Prefecture. Both lines primarily function as commuter rails, but the latter also transports tourists to the Izu Peninsula.
Daiyūzan Line
Sunzu Line
 Jukkokutōge Cable Car
 Hakone Komagatake Ropeway

In the past, it also operated "Komagatake Cable Line" (駒ヶ岳鋼索線), which was connected to the ropeway at the top of the mountain from 1957 to 2005.

Excursion ships
Lake Ashi Excursion Ship
Mito Excursion Ship
Lake Hamana Excursion Ship

See also
List of railway companies in Japan

External links

References

 
Railway companies of Japan
Bus companies of Japan
Rail transport in Kanagawa Prefecture
Rail transport in Shizuoka Prefecture
Companies formerly listed on the Tokyo Stock Exchange